William McLaughlin Taylor Sr. (April 2, 1876 – May 1, 1959) was a justice of the Supreme Court of Texas from September 21, 1945 to December 31, 1950.

His son, William McLaughlin Taylor Jr., was a United States federal judge.

References

Justices of the Texas Supreme Court
1876 births
1959 deaths